Concavibalcis scalaris is a species of sea snail, a marine gastropod mollusk in the family Eulimidae. The species is the only one known to exist within the genus, Concavibalcis.

References

External links
 To World Register of Marine Species

Eulimidae
Gastropods described in 1980